Raphaël Beaugillet (born 17 September 1989) is a French Paralympic cyclist. He won bronze in the Men's time trial B in 2020.

References

External links
 Raphaël Beaugillet at IDEC SPORT
 Raphaël Beaugillet at Bleus Handisport
 

1989 births
Living people
French male cyclists
Paralympic cyclists of France
Paralympic bronze medalists for France
Paralympic medalists in cycling
Cyclists at the 2020 Summer Paralympics
Medalists at the 2020 Summer Paralympics
21st-century French people